Tomoo is a masculine Japanese given name.

Possible writings
Tomoo can be written using different combinations of kanji characters. Some examples:

友雄, "friend, masculine"
友男, "friend, man"
友夫, "friend, husband"
知雄, "know, masculine"
知男, "know, man"
知夫, "know, husband"
智雄, "intellect, masculine"
智男, "intellect, man"
智夫, "intellect, husband"
共雄, "together, masculine"
共男, "together, man"
朋雄, "companion, masculine"
朋男, "companion, man"
朝雄, "morning/dynasty, masculine"
朝男, "morning/dynasty, man"
朝夫, "morning/dynasty, husband"

The name can also be written in hiragana ともお or katakana トモオ.

Notable people with the name
, Japanese basketball player
, Japanese golfer
, Japanese footballer
, Japanese political scientist
, Japanese lawyer and politician
, Japanese rebel
, Japanese judoka

Japanese masculine given names